Blacken the Sun is the debut album of extreme metal band, As They Sleep. They have been compared to Lamb of God and The Black Dahlia Murder.

Track listing

Credits
As They Sleep
 Aaron Bridgewater - vocals
 Paul Burrett - drums
 Barry Gomez - guitars
 Derek Kosiba - bass
 Nick Morris - guitars, production, mixing
Additional Musicians
 Steve Longworth - piano
Production
 Colin Davis - Mastering
 Kingsley - Photography

References

External links
 

2008 debut albums
As They Sleep albums